Peter Geoffrey Foster (9 October 1916 – 7 December 1994) was an English businessman and amateur cricketer. He played in 30 first-class cricket matches for Oxford University and Kent County Cricket Club between 1936 and 1946.

Early life
Foster was born at Beckenham in Kent in 1916, the son of Geoffrey and Vera Foster. His father was a businessman who was serving in the East Riding Yeomanry at the time of Foster's birth. He had played cricket for Worcestershire and Kent and was one of seven brothers all of whom played first-class cricket for Worcestershire.

Foster was educated at Winchester College before going up to Christ Church, Oxford in 1935. He had played cricket at school, headed the Winchester batting averages in 1934 and played for the Public Schools at Lord's in 1935. During the same year he made his first appearance for Kent's Second XI.

Cricket career
Foster made his first-class debut for Oxford in 1936, playing against Gloucestershire at The Parks. He played a total of five matches for the Oxford side but did not win a Blue and was unable to win a consistent place in a strong Oxford side, although he continued to play occasionally for Kent in the Minor Counties Championship. He also played racquets and golf for the university, winning Blues in both sports.

The majority of Foster's first-class cricket―a total of 24 matches―was played for Kent during the 1939 season. He played in almost all of the county's matches, scoring 725 runs at an average of 19.59. His only first-class century, a score of 107 not out, came against Leicestershire during the season, and he made half-centuries against Glamorgan and Nottinghamshire both of which were praised by Wisden.

Foster played club cricket for sides such as Free Foresters, Harlequins, Southborough and Band of Brothers. He played in Kent's first County Championship match of 1946, but business commitments meant that he was not able to appear again for the county.

War service and later life
Foster joined the Royal West Kent Regiment during World War II, before transferring to the Queen's Royal Regiment. He rose to the rank of Captain during the war.

Following the war, Foster worked on the London Stock Exchange. He was President of Kent County Cricket Club in 1991 and died following a heart attack in 1994 aged 78.

References

External links
 

1916 births
1994 deaths
Alumni of Christ Church, Oxford
Cricketers from Beckenham
English cricketers
Kent cricketers
Oxford University cricketers